Kirby: Genesis is an American comic book limited series published from May 25, 2011, to July 11, 2012, by Dynamite Entertainment. It was based on Jack Kirby's work for Pacific Comics in the 1980s and the "Kirbyverse" line published by Topps Comics in the 1990s.

Plot 
In 1971, NASA launched space probe Pioneer 10 for a mission on Jupiter, but the probe later found a portal that drove it across the universe at light speed. The event was witnessed through a telescope by Kirby Freeman, a smart, young student from New York City who lives with his college partner and secret romantic interest, Bobbi Cortez, whose father, Jake, is a police officer. Some time later, two mysterious beings transported alien races across the universe. Kirby, Bobbi, and Jake must work together to solve the mystery these heroes are on Earth before a group of villains threaten to destroy it.

Titles

Trade paperbacks 
 Kirby: Genesis (288 pages, August 29, 2012)
 Kirby: Genesis – Silver Star (152 pages, January 9, 2013)
 Kirby: Genesis – Captain Victory (144 pages, January 9, 2013)
 Kirby: Genesis – Dragonsbane (104 pages, August 17, 2016)

References 

Jack Kirby
2011 comics debuts
2013 comics endings
Dynamite Entertainment titles
Comics by Kurt Busiek
Crossover comics
Fantasy comics
Science fiction comics
Superhero comics
Mythopoeia
Mythology in comics
Comics set in the 1970s
Metafictional comics